Chapman Elementary School may refer to:

 Chapman Elementary School of the Portland Public Schools in Oregon
 Chapman Elementary School in Spartanburg County School District 7, South Carolina
 Chapman Intermediate School, in Woodstock, Georgia

See also
Chapman High School (disambiguation)
Chapman School of Seamanship, in Florida
Chapman University, in California